Erechthias penicillata is a moth of the family Tineidae. It was first described by Otto Herman Swezey in 1909. It is found in the Pacific region, including French Polynesia and Hawaii.

The wingspan is about 10 mm. Adults are pale straw colored with darker scales scattered variably over the forewings. The tips of the forewings are conspicuously turned up at right angles to the wing. An unusual feature of this species is its strong development of secondary sexual characteristics: the strongly developed, dense, elongated, ovate patch of modified orange scales in the cell on the underside of the forewing and the strong, yellow brush of the sub-costal area of the hindwing.

The larvae feed in the dead leaves of Pandanus species.

External links

Erechthiinae
Moths described in 1909